In the Heat of the Night may refer to:

 In the Heat of the Night (novel), a 1965 novel by John Ball
 In the Heat of the Night (film), a 1967 film based on the novel
 In the Heat of the Night (TV series), a 1988–1995 television series based on the film

Albums 
 In the Heat of the Night (Pat Benatar album), 1979
 In the Heat of the Night (Imagination album), 1982
 In the Heat of the Night (Jeff Lorber album), 1984
 Live – In the Heat of the Night, a 2000 album by Diamond Head

Songs 
 "In the Heat of the Night" (Ray Charles song), song for the 1967 film performed by Ray Charles, composed by Quincy Jones, and written by Marilyn Bergman and Alan Bergman; covered by Bill Champlin for the TV series.
 "In the Heat of the Night" (Imagination song), 1982
 "In the Heat of the Night" (Sandra song), 1985
 "In the Heat of the Night", a song by Diamond Head from Borrowed Time
 "In the Heat of the Night", a song by Krokus from Stampede
 "In the Heat of the Night", a song by Smokie and Pat Benatar
 "In the Heat of the Night", a song by Star Pilots

See also 
 Heat of the Night, a 1997 song by Aqua
 "Heat of the Night", a 1987 song by Bryan Adams
 "Heat of the Night" (Paulina Rubio song), 2011